Blumkin is an  Askenazi surname, coined from Yiddish Blum - 'flower'. Notable people with the surname include:

 Rose Blumkin (1893–1998), American businesswoman
 Yakov Blumkin (1900–1929), Russian revolutionary and spy

See also 
 Blume#Surname
 Blum (surname)

Ashkenazi surnames